The River Laver is a tributary of the River Skell, itself a tributary of the River Ure in North Yorkshire, England. The name is of Brittonic origin, from labaro, meaning "talkative", i.e. a babbling brook.  The Afon Llafar in Wales shares the same name.

The Laver is noted as a fly fishing river, especially for brown trout and grayling.

Course

The river has its origins in a number of small streams which rise on the moors between upper Nidderdale and Kirkby Malzeard.  The two largest of these streams, North Gill Beck and South Gill Beck, meet in a narrow wooded valley at Dallowgill to form the River Laver.  The river continues to flow through a narrow wooded valley, before broadening at Laverton.  The riverbanks again become densely wooded near Winksley, then become more open and shallow as the river approaches Ripon.  The river joins the River Skell at the western edge of Ripon.

Hydrology
The flow of the River Laver has been measured at a weir in Ripon, near to its confluence with the Skell since 1977.

References

External links 

Laver